Frederick "Fred" Erskine Olmsted Jr. (April 10, 1911 – February 14, 1990) was an American artist and biophysicist. He created social realism themed murals and sculptures for the Federal Art Project, and the Public Works of Art Project. 

Later, he became a scientist and biophysicist at Yale University, the Cleveland Clinic, and Woods Hole Oceanographic Institution.

Early life 
Olmsted was born in San Francisco, California. He was the son of  Florence Starbuck du Bois and Frederick E. Olmsted, a United States Forest Service administrator and one of the founders of American forestry. He was a great-nephew of the landscape architect  Frederick Law Olmsted.

Olmsted studied science at Stanford University. He was studied art under of Ralph Stackpole at the California School of Fine Arts (now the San Francisco Art Institute).

Career

Art 
During the Great Depression, Olmsted worked for the Works Progress Administration, assisting John Langley Howard and George Albert Harris in their Coit Tower murals in San Francisco. Although he was an undergraduate student assistant, Olmsted was allowed to create his a three-foot by three-foot fresco mural called "Power" for the Public Works of Art Project. The mural is located above the main entrance on the outer north wall of Coit Tower. It features a fist "to give rise to the proletariat."

Olmsted also assisted Diego Rivera with his 1931 mural "The Making of a Mural Showing the Building of a City" at the San Francisco Art Institute (SFAI). Olmsted also painted a window archway called "Pottery" in the Anne Bremer Memorial Library at the SFAI.

In 1935 while still an art student, he painted a fresco mural at the SFAI named "Marble Workers" which depicted tradesmen at work at a Fisherman's Wharf tile shop. At some point, the Works Progress Administration-funded mural was painted over. In 2013, the "Marble Workers" was rediscovered and a Save America’s Treasures grant was awarded to offset the cost of its restoration in September 2019.

In 1935, Olmsted's work was included in the San Francisco Museum of Art Inaugural exhibition. The same year, he also was included at a show at the California School of Fine Arts, winning the award.

He carved the stone sculptures during the WPA's Art in Action, an exhibition of artists working live for audiences in the summer of 1940. When the Golden Gate International Exposition was over, the sculptures were donated to City College of San Francisco (CCSF) and are currently on display at the CCSF Ocean Campus.

In 1941, Olmsted painted two  foot tempera fresco murals at the City College of San Francisco for the Federal Arts Project (FAP) of the Works Progress Administration. Called "Theory and Science 2" and "Theory and Science 3", the murals are in the lobby of the Science Building over the west entrance stairs. The murals show male and female students engaged in scientific activities such as conducting field research, excavating a dinosaur fossil, and looking at bacteria through a microscope. Olmsted created the murals using small brush strokes and a muted, earth-toned color palette.

Olmsted taught art for a few years at Arts and Crafts in Oakland (now called California College of Art).

Biophysics 
In the early 1940s, Olmsted abandoned his art career and became a scientist at Yale University. He designed medical equipment for the Cleveland Clinic, developing a machine to shock the diseased hearts of dogs, a prototype for today's pacemaker. Next, Olmsted designed equipment for the Woods Hole Oceanographic Institution in Massachusetts.

Personal  life 
While at the California School of Fine Arts Olmsted met and later married Barbara Greene. The two later divorced.

In 1998, he died in Falmouth, Massachusetts at the age of 78.

References

External sources 

 City College of San Francisco: Olmsted murals 
 San Francisco City College: Olmsted sculptures

1911 births
1990 deaths
People from Falmouth, Massachusetts
Stanford University alumni
San Francisco Art Institute alumni
20th-century American painters
American male painters
Social realist artists
Artists from the San Francisco Bay Area
American muralists
Federal Art Project artists
American biophysicists
20th-century American male artists
California College of the Arts faculty
Public Works of Art Project artists
Sculptors from California
Artists from San Francisco